The Anti-Jap Laundry League was an organization founded in 1908 in the United States by the Laundry Workers' and Laundry Drivers' Unions. The league, based in San Francisco, attempted to financially harm laundries run by Japanese Americans using four different tactics: picketing laundries, following customers back to their homes and intimidating them, preventing the laundries from purchasing equipment, and threatening public officials who refused to punish the laundries. They successfully ruined many Japanese laundries in this way. In the laundries run by league members, posters such as the following were hung on the walls:

Are our boys and girls wrong 
In expecting you who make your living 
Exclusively off the white race 
To stop patronizing Jap laundries. 
And thereby assist your fellow men and women 
In maintaining the white man's standard in a white man's country? 
Anti-Jap Laundry League. 

California Attorney General Ulysses S. Webb put great effort into enforcing laws against Asian ownership of property.

See also
Anti-Japanese sentiment in the United States
Asiatic Exclusion League
Jap

References

External links
1911 Anti-Jap Laundry League annual report from University of California, Berkeley Libraries

1908 establishments in California
Anti-immigration politics in the United States
Asian-American history
Asian-American issues
History of racism in the United States
Immigration to the United States
Japanese-American history
Organizations established in 1908
20th century in San Francisco
Laundry organizations
History of racism in California